The Suhat is a right tributary of the river Valea Albă in Romania. It discharges into the Valea Albă near Drăgănești-Vlașca.

References

Rivers of Romania
Rivers of Teleorman County